The Northeast Siberian coastal tundra ecoregion (WWF ID: PA1107) is an ecoregion that covers the coastal plain of the central north region of Siberia in Russia. This coastal region borders the Laptev Sea and the East Siberian Sea, both marginal seas of the Arctic Ocean, from the Lena River delta in the west to the Kolyma River delta in the east. There are several large river deltas in the area that support breeding grounds for 60 to 80 species of migratory birds. The region is in the Palearctic realm, and the tundra biome.

Location and description 
The ecoregion stretches 1,100 km along the north coast of Siberia, from the Lena River delta in the west to the Kolyma River delta in the east.  The terrain is flat and rolling tundra.  The entire region is on continuous permafrost. Thermokarst lakes are common, caused by the freezing and thawing of permafrost.

Climate 
The region has a Humid continental climate - cool summer subtype (Koppen classification Dfc). Mean precipitation is about 200 mm/year.

Flora and fauna 
Plants of the ecoregion are those typical of the tundra landscape, with some isolated strands of larch taiga in the southern sectors.  Dwarf shrubs, grasses, sedges, and moss are dominant.  Common plant families include cotton grasses (Eriophorum), sedges (Carex), Dryas, willows (Salix), and various species of Vaccinium.

See also 
 List of ecoregions in Russia
 East Siberian Lowland

References 

Ecoregions of Russia
Palearctic ecoregions
Tundra ecoregions
East Siberian Lowland